The 1986–87 Chicago Bulls season was the 21st season of the franchise in the National Basketball Association (NBA).

NBA Draft

Note: This is not an extensive list; it only covers the first and second rounds, and any other players drafted by the franchise that played at least one NBA game.

Roster

Regular season

With yet another new head coach, Doug Collins, in for 1986-87, the Bulls improved to 40-42. Chicago qualified for the playoffs for the third straight season but was again eliminated by Boston in the first round.

The team's record was a secondary concern for most fans, who had their eyes riveted on team superstar Jordan. In late November and early December he went on a rampage, scoring 40 or more points in nine consecutive games. On February 26 he poured in 58 points against the New Jersey Nets, including a record 26 of 27 free throws. On March 4 he hit for 61 points against Detroit. Just a month later, on April 16, he matched that performance with 61 against Atlanta. That season Jordan became the first NBA player to reach 3,000 points in a season since Wilt Chamberlain did it in 1962-63.

Jordan led the league in scoring at 37.1 points per game, his career high for a season. He set Bulls single-season records for points (3,041), field goals (1,098), free throws (833), and steals (236). His output was rewarded with the first in a series of All-NBA First Team selections.

Season standings

Record vs. opponents

Game log

Playoffs

|- align="center" bgcolor="#ffcccc"
| 1
| April 23
| @ Boston
| L 104–108
| Michael Jordan (35)
| Charles Oakley (12)
| Michael Jordan (7)
| Boston Garden14,890
| 0–1
|- align="center" bgcolor="#ffcccc"
| 2
| April 26
| @ Boston
| L 96–105
| Michael Jordan (42)
| Charles Oakley (15)
| Jordan, Threatt (4)
| Boston Garden14,890
| 0–2
|- align="center" bgcolor="#ffcccc"
| 3
| April 28
| Boston
| L 94–105
| Michael Jordan (30)
| Charles Oakley (19)
| Michael Jordan (7)
| Chicago Stadium18,122
| 0–3
|-

Player statistics

===Season===

Playoffs

Awards and records
 Michael Jordan, NBA All-Star Weekend Slam Dunk Contest Winner
 Michael Jordan, All-NBA First Team
 Michael Jordan, NBA All-Star Game

Transactions

See also
 1986-87 NBA season

References

 

Chicago Bulls seasons
Chicago Bulls
Chicago Bulls
Chicago Bulls